Department may refer to:

 Departmentalization, division of a larger organization into parts with specific responsibility

Government and military
Department (administrative division), a geographical and administrative division within a country, for example:
Departments of Colombia, a grouping of municipalities
Departments of France, administrative divisions three levels below the national government
Departments of Honduras
Departments of Peru, name given to the subdivisions of Peru until 2002
Departments of Uruguay
Department (United States Army), corps areas of the U.S. Army prior to World War I
Fire department, a public or private organization that provides emergency firefighting and rescue services
Ministry (government department), a specialized division of a government
Police department, a body empowered by the state to enforce the law
Department (naval) administrative/functional sub-unit of a ship's company.

Other uses
Department (film), a 2012 Bollywood action film about police taking on Mumbai criminals
The Department (film), a 2015 Nigerian action film, about two lovers undermining dodgy business dealings
The Department, a satirical comedy on BBC Radio 4
The Department (play), a 1975 play by David Williamson
The Department, a 1980 TV film based on the play
Academic department, a division of a university or school faculty devoted to a particular academic discipline
Department head, a management position
Department store, a retail store that includes many specialized departments such as clothing or household items

See also
Ministry
Departments of the United Kingdom Government
United States federal executive departments
List of Australian Commonwealth Government entities
Structure of the Canadian federal government
Federal administration of Switzerland

it:Dipartimento#Voci correlate